Centennial Fountain (also known as the Centennial Plaza Fountain) is an outdoor fountain in Bricktown, Oklahoma City, in the U.S. state of Oklahoma. The $300,000 fountain, located along the Bricktown Canal at the intersection of Reno Avenue and Mickey Mantle Drive, was completed in 2004. The Oklahoma Centennial Commission and private donors funded the project. The fountain underwent repairs in 2005.

References

External links

 
 Centennial Fountain in Bricktown - Oklahoma City, OK at Waymarking

2004 establishments in Oklahoma
Bricktown, Oklahoma City
Fountains in Oklahoma